Samad (also Romanized as Şamad; also known as Deh-e Şamad ‘Īsá Zahī) is a village in Margan Rural District, in the Central District of Hirmand County, Sistan and Baluchestan Province, Iran. At the 2006 census, its population was 87, in 18 families.

References 

Populated places in Hirmand County